Lorinza "Junior" Harrington Jr. (born October 2, 1980) is an American former professional basketball player.

Pro career
The 6'4" (1.93 m) guard from North Carolina's Wingate University began his professional career as an undrafted free agent with the Denver Nuggets, for whom he played all 82 games during the 2002–03 NBA season.

He has played professionally in the NBA, the Continental Basketball Association (CBA), Spain, Ukraine, Russia and Slovenia.

During his time in the NBA with the Denver Nuggets, New Orleans Hornets, and Memphis Grizzlies, he played a total of 140 games averaging 5.2 points per game and 3.1 assists per game.

In February 2007, Harrington was signed to a 10-day contract by the Memphis Grizzlies. In January 2009, Harrington was signed until end of the season by the Euroleague club Union Olimpija.

References

External links 
 Junior Harrington NBA Historical Player Profile @ NBA.com
 Player Profile @euroleague.net

1980 births
Living people
ABA League players
African-American basketball players
American expatriate basketball people in Colombia
American expatriate basketball people in Poland
American expatriate basketball people in Russia
American expatriate basketball people in Slovenia
American expatriate basketball people in Spain
American expatriate basketball people in Ukraine
American men's basketball players
Asseco Gdynia players
Basketball players from North Carolina
BC Azovmash players
Dakota Wizards (CBA) players
Denver Nuggets players
KK Olimpija players
KK Włocławek players
Liga ACB players
Memphis Grizzlies players
New Orleans Hornets players
PBC Lokomotiv-Kuban players
People from Scotland County, North Carolina
Point guards
Shooting guards
Trefl Sopot players
Undrafted National Basketball Association players
Valencia Basket players
Wingate Bulldogs men's basketball players
21st-century African-American sportspeople
20th-century African-American people